Tangi William Edward Utikere  (born ) is a New Zealand politician, and Member of Parliament for  since 2020. He was the deputy mayor of Palmerston North from 2016 to 2020, being the first non-European to serve in that role.

Early life and professional career
Utikere was born and educated in Palmerston North and is of Cook Islands descent. In 1997 he was a member of the New Zealand Youth Parliament, selected to represent List MP Jill White. He studied and later taught at Freyberg High School as a history teacher, and is also a Justice of the peace and marriage celebrant. On 2 June 2020, Utikere was appointed as a member of the New Zealand Criminal Cases Review Commission.

Political career

Utikere unsuccessfully contested the Labour nomination for the Palmerston North electorate following the retirement of Steve Maharey in 2008, losing to Iain Lees-Galloway. He was first elected to the Palmerston North City Council in 2010, and was re-elected in 2013. In 2015 he unsuccessfully ran for Mayor, coming second behind Grant Smith. He was re-elected to the City Council in 2016 and in 2019 was re-elected as the city's highest polling city councillor. In 2016 he was appointed as deputy mayor.

On 26 July 2020 Utikere was selected as Labour's candidate for the Palmerston North electorate following the announcement that Iain Lees-Galloway would not be standing. During the election campaign he donated his deputy mayor's salary to the city's Mayoral Relief Fund.

During the 2020 New Zealand general election held on 17 October, Utikere won the seat, retaining it for Labour by a margin of 12,508 votes and nearly doubling Lees-Galloway's lead during the 2017 New Zealand general election.

In February 2021 a by-election was held to fill his vacant seat on the city council, it was won by Orphée Mickalad.

In July 2021, his Member's Bill requiring all local council elected members to publicly declare their pecuniary interests on a Register, was drawn from the ballot. It was passed into law by Parliament in May 2022.

Having served on Parliament's Governance and Administration and Environment select committees, on 4 May 2022 Utikere became the Chairperson of the Health Select Committee. In a January 2023 Cabinet reshuffle, Prime Minister Chris Hipkins appointed Utikere as Chief Government Whip.

References

|-

|-

Living people
Year of birth missing (living people)
21st-century New Zealand politicians
People from Palmerston North
New Zealand people of Cook Island descent
New Zealand justices of the peace
New Zealand Labour Party politicians
Palmerston North City Councillors
Deputy mayors of places in New Zealand
Candidates in the 2020 New Zealand general election
New Zealand Labour Party MPs
Members of the New Zealand House of Representatives
New Zealand MPs for North Island electorates
LGBT members of the Parliament of New Zealand
New Zealand Youth MPs